Enterogyrus is a genus of monogeneans belonging to the family Ancyrocephalidae. 

All members of the genus are parasitic on fish, but, in contrast to most ancyrocephalid which are parasites on the gills, species of Enterogyrus are parasite in the digestive system.

Species
The following species are considered valid according to WorRMS: 

 Enterogyrus amieti Bilong Bilong, Euzet & Birgi, 1996 
 Enterogyrus barombiensis Bilong Bilong, Birgi & Euzet, 1991
 Enterogyrus cichlidarum Paperna, 1963 
 Enterogyrus coronatus Pariselle, Lambert & Euzet, 1991 
 Enterogyrus crassus Bilong Bilong, Euzet & Birgi, 1996 
 Enterogyrus foratus Pariselle, Lambert & Euzet, 1991 
 Enterogyrus malmbergi Bilong Bilong, 1988
 Enterogyrus melenensis Bilong Bilong, Birgi & Lambert, 1989

Gallery

References

Ancyrocephalidae
Monogenea genera